This is a list of gender identities. Gender identity can be understood to include how someone describes themselves, how they present, and how they feel.

A 
 Abinary
 Agender
 
 Androgyne
 Androgynos
 Androgynous
 Aporagender

B 
 Bakla
 Bigender
 Binary
 Bissu
 Butch

C 
 Calabai
 Calalai
 Cis
 Cisgender can be defined as "personal identity and gender corresponds with their sex assigned at birth."
 Cis female
 Cis male
 Cis man
 Cis woman

D 
 Demi-boy
 Demiflux
 Demigender
 Demi-girl
 Demi-guy
 Demi-man
 Demi-woman
 Dual gender

E 

 Endosex
 Eunuch

F 
 Faʻafafine
 Female
 Female to male
 Femme
 FTM

G 
 Gender bender
 
 Gender gifted
 Genderfluid can be defined as a gender identity that is "at times more masculine or feminine, and at times feeling more like a man or woman."
 
 
 
 
 Gender nonconforming
 Genderqueer
 Gender questioning
 Gender variant
 Graygender

H 

 Hijra

I
  can be defined as "an identity somewhat between male and female".
 Intersex

K 

 Kathoey

M 
 Male
 Male to female
 Man
 Man of trans experience
 Maverique
 MTF
 
 Muxe

N
 Neither
 
  
 Non-binary can be defined as "does not subscribe to the gender binary but identifies with neither, both, or beyond male and female". The term may be used as "an umbrella term, encompassing several gender identities, including intergender, agender, xenogender, genderfluid, and demigender." Some non-binary identities are inclusive, because two or more genders are referenced, such as androgyne/androgynous, intergender, bigender, trigender, polygender, and pangender. Some non-binary identities are exclusive, because no gender is referenced, such as agender, genderless, neutrois, and xenogender.
 Non-binary transgender

O
 Omnigender
 Other

P
 Pangender
 Polygender
 Person of transgendered experience

Q 

 Queer

S 

 Sekhet

T
 Third gender
 Trans can be defined as "outside the gender binary; is not cisgender."
 Trans*
 Trans female
 Trans male
 Trans man
 Trans person
 Trans woman
 Transgender can be defined as "gender identity differs from their sex assigned at birth."
 Transgender female
 Transgender male
 Transgender man
 Transgender person
 Transgender woman
 Transfeminine
 Transmasculine
 Transsexual
 Transsexual female
 Transsexual male
 Transsexual man
 Transsexual person
 Transsexual woman
 Travesti
 Trigender
 Tumtum
 Two spirit

V
Vakasalewalewa

W
 Waria
 Winkte
 Woman
 Woman of trans experience

X
 X-gender
 Xenogender can be defined as a gender identity that references "ideas and identities outside of gender". This may include descriptions of gender identity in terms of "their first name or as a real or imaginary animal" or "texture, size, shape, light, sound, or other sensory characteristics".

See also
Gender neutrality in languages with gendered third-person pronouns
LGBT slang
Neopronouns
Singular they

References

Gender identity
Neologisms
Transgender identities
LGBT-related lists